Paul Kent (October 13, 1930 – October 7, 2011) was an American actor and the founder/artistic director of the Melrose Theatre in West Hollywood.

Biography

Early life
Kent was born as Paul Inglese on October 13, 1930 in Brooklyn, New York. He studied acting at the Pasadena Playhouse and briefly served in the United States Army during the Korean War. In 1958, he and his parents moved from New York to California, where he trained under Sanford Meisner and later assisted Meisner with his classes. The two became close friends and colleagues during Meisner's life, and when Meisner left Los Angeles to go back to New York, he left his teaching methods to be carried on in the West by Kent who consequently taught acting for many years through his theater.

Kent played a part in the formation of Lucille Ball's Desilu Workshop, where he became the first acting student signed by the workshop. According to Hedda Hopper, when Kent appeared at the workshop to help a female friend at an audition, he was discovered by Ball and promptly signed to an actor-stage manager contract. Kent's acting roles during this period included a small part in an episode of December Bride in 1957.

Acting instruction
In 1964, Kent founded the Melrose Theater, in the city of West Hollywood, with the assistance of fellow actors including Tom Troupe, Carole Cook, Richard Bull and Don Eitner. Funds for the theater were partially raised by a guest appearance with Lucille Ball and Gary Morton on Password.

Kent later recalled in an interview with The Los Angeles Times:

In 1976, Kent entered into a partnership with workshop organizer Jomarie Ward to purchase a former bakery and photographer's studio at 733 North Seward Street, a half block north of Melrose Avenue, in the Hollywood neighborhood of Los Angeles. With the assistance of Ward and members of the workshop, the building was renovated and converted to the new Melrose Theater in 1977. The new, larger theater became the permanent headquarters of the Melrose, with Kent installed as artistic director and Ward as managing director.

In 1984, Kent decided to create a production employing the largest possible number of Melrose actors, and convened several playwrights at the Mark Taper Forum to write a play in a bar setting to be produced by the theater. The resulting collaboration, The Bar Off Melrose, was credited to fifteen playwrights and employed nearly forty actors. The play premiered successfully in 1986, and is still performed today at various theaters, drama workshops and colleges.

Acting career
While serving as artistic director of the Melrose Theater, Kent also acted in many of its plays, and continued acting in film and television. One of Kent's acting appearances in the 1970s was a small part in the television miniseries Helter Skelter. The part was notable because Kent later played a different character in the 2004 adaptation directed by John Gray. Gray later bought Kent back to play a spirit in the episode "Mended Hearts", of his TV seriesGhost Whisperer. In addition, Kent often played different characters in multiple episodes of a series, including his appearances in Lou Grant, T. J. Hooker and Falcon Crest.

In 1982, Kent portrayed Commander Beach, the helmsman and third-in-command of the Starship USS Reliant in Star Trek II: The Wrath of Khan. When the ill-fated starship was commandeered by Ricardo Montalbán's Khan, the character of Beach would be marooned on a desolate planet along with the majority of the ship's crew until rescued by the USS Enterprise.

In 1987 Kent played Harry M. Daugherty in a biographical TV movie of J. Edgar Hoover, produced by Showtime. In 1999, he became the third actor to play the character of Doctor Noel Clinton in Port Charles, a spinoff of General Hospital, succeeding actors Dean Harens and Ron Husmann. He had a lead starring role as the character of Miles Mason in Viagra Falls, a television pilot. One of his final acting roles was his portrayal of Mack Sennett in Return to Babylon, an independent film released in 2013.

In 1975, Kent reflected on his craft to Los Angeles Times reporter Lawrence Christon:

Personal life
Kent was the father of several children. At the time of his death he was married to actress and author Madelyn Cain.

Death
Kent died on October 7, 2011, six days before his 81st birthday, in Hollywood Hills, California from multiple myeloma. He was buried in Forest Lawn Memorial Park in Hollywood Hills.

Partial filmography

Film

Television

References

External links
 

 Obituary - Variety
 

1930 births
2011 deaths
American male film actors
American people of Italian descent
American male soap opera actors
American male television actors
Male actors from New York City
Deaths from multiple myeloma
Deaths from cancer in California
People from Brooklyn
20th-century American male actors
21st-century American male actors